Poropuntius heterolepidotus is a species of ray-finned fish in the genus Poropuntius. It is a little known species and it is restricted to smaller tributaries of the lower Salween basin in Thailand and Myanmar.

References 

heterolepidotus
Fish described in 1998